Windows Glyph List 4, or more commonly WGL4 for short, also known as the Pan-European character set, is a character repertoire on Microsoft operating systems comprising 657 Unicode characters, two of them private use. Its purpose is to provide an implementation guideline for producers of fonts for the representation of European natural languages; fonts that provide glyphs for the entire set of characters can claim WGL4 compliance and thus can expect to be compatible with a wide range of software.

, WGL4 characters were the only ones guaranteed to display correctly on Microsoft Windows. More recent versions of Windows display far more glyphs.

Because many fonts are designed to fulfill the WGL4 set, this set of characters is likely to work (display as other than replacement glyphs) on many computer systems. For example, all the non-private-use characters in the table below are likely to display properly, compared to the many missing characters that may be seen in other articles about Unicode.

Repertoire
The repertoire, defined by Microsoft, encompasses all the characters found in Microsoft's code pages 1252 (Windows Western), 1250 (Windows Central European), 1251 (Windows Cyrillic), 1253 (Windows Greek), 1254 (Windows Turkish), and 1257 (Windows Baltic), as well as characters from MS-DOS code page 437.

It does not cover the combining diacritics used by Vietnamese-related code page 1258, the Thai letters used in code page 874, Hebrew and Arabic letters covered by code pages 1255 and 1256, or the ideographic characters used by code pages 932, 936, 949 and 950.

It also does not cover the Romanian letters Ș, ș, Ț, and ț (U+0218–B), which were added to several of Microsoft's fonts for Windows Vista (long after the WGL4 repertoire was originally defined).

In version 1.5 of the OpenType Specification (May 2008) four Cyrillic characters were added to the WGL4 character set: Ѐ (U+0400), Ѝ (U+040D), ѐ (U+0450) and ѝ (U+045D).

Character table

Legend

Notes

See also
 Adobe Glyph List
 World Glyph Set (W1G)
 Multilingual European Subsets MES-1 and MES-2

External links
 WGL4.0 Character Set on Microsoft Typography

Digital typography
Microsoft Windows multimedia technology
Character encoding
Glyphs
Articles with unsupported PUA characters